Region 6 or Region VI can refer to:

 One of DVD region
 East Berbice-Corentyne, Region 6 in Guyana
 Region 6, Northwest Territories
 One of health regions of Canada managed by Vitalité Health Network
 Former Region 6 (Johannesburg), an administrative district in the city of Johannesburg, South Africa, from 2000 to 2006
O'Higgins Region, Chile
Western Visayas Region, Philippines
Region 6 War Room

Region name disambiguation pages